The Brownsdale Public Library is a public library in Brownsdale, Minnesota, United States. It is a member of Southeastern Libraries Cooperating, the Southeast Minnesota library region.

References

External links
GoogleMap to Library
Online Catalog

Buildings and structures in Mower County, Minnesota
Education in Mower County, Minnesota
Public libraries in Minnesota